Furusato means "hometown" in Japanese and may refer to:
 "Furusato" (children's song), a 1914 Japanese children's song
 "Furusato" (Morning Musume song), a 1999 song by the Japanese girl group Morning Musume
, a 1972 Japanese film by Yoji Yamada also known as Home From The Sea
 Furusato, a 1983 Japanese film
 77560 Furusato, asteroid.